Jahzara Claxton (born 12 March 2006) is a Saint Kitts and Nevis footballer who plays as a forward for Newtown United FC and the Saint Kitts and Nevis women's national team. Claxton also plays cricket for the West Indies Under 19 team. She is the first ever female cricketer from the Leeward Islands to be selected to the West Indies U19 squad.

Football career

Club career
Claxton has played for Newtown United in Saint Kitts and Nevis.

International career
In 2019, Claxton represented the Saint Kitts and Nevis U14 at the Caribbean Football Union Caribbean Challenge Series. On August 9, 2019, she scored five goals in an 8-0 victory over Dominica U14. On August 10, 2019, she scored four goals in a 4-2 victory over Antigua and Barbuda U14. She scored 11 goals in the team's three games as they finished second in their group.

Claxton represented Saint Kitts and Nevis U20 at two CONCACAF Women's U-20 Championship editions (2020 and 2022). On 27 February 2022, she scored a hat trick against Trinidad and Tobago U20. She is the second top goal-scorer for Caribbean U20 girls.

She made her senior debut on 3 February 2022 as a 62nd-minute substitution in a 3–0 friendly away win over Anguilla, scoring the team's third goal. On 8 April 2022, she scored the winning goal in a 2-1 victory over Guatemala during 2022 CONCACAF W Championship qualification, scoring a goal with her back.

Cricket career
In 2022, she played with the Leewards Islands U19 team. In September 2022, she was named to a provisional roster and invited to a training camp for the West Indies women's under-19 cricket team. In November 2022, she was officially named to the West Indies women's under-19 cricket team. She is the first female cricketer from St. Kitts, as well as the first female cricketer from the Leeward Islands to be selected to the West Indies U19 squad. She was awarded a financial contribution from the Saint Kitts and Nevis Ministry of Sports to develop her sporting skills further as well as to offset expenses while she was representing the West Indies team. She participated with the team at the 2023 ICC Under-19 Women's T20 World Cup.

Personal
In December 2022, she was named one of the 25 Most Remarkable Teens by the National Assembly of St Kitts and Nevis.

References

External links

2006 births
Living people
Saint Kitts and Nevis women's footballers
Women's association football forwards
Newtown United FC players
Saint Kitts and Nevis women's international footballers